Los Días calientes is a 1966 Argentine comedy film directed by Armando Bó.

Plot

This is the story of a woman who travels to the islands on the delta of the Parana River to fight for her inheritance.

Cast

Isabel Sarli
Mario Passano
Ricardo Passano
Claude Marting
Raúl del Valle
Mario Casado
Elcira Olivera Garcés
Roberto Crohare
Juan Pitrau

References

External links

1966 films
Argentine comedy films
1960s Spanish-language films
Films directed by Armando Bó
1960s Argentine films